The University of Foggia, located in Foggia, Italy, was founded in 1991 and was fully recognized in 1999. Although it has taken some time for the university to receive its entitlement and acknowledgement, through that timestamp it has branched off from five faculties to six: the Faculty of Economics, the Faculty of Law, the Faculty of Clinical and Experimental Medicine, the Faculty of Medical and Surgical Sciences, the Faculty of Agricultural Sciences, Food and Environment, and the Faculty of the Humanities: Literature, Cultural Heritage, and Educational Sciences.  It has also been named as the best university of southern Italy by the newspaper Il Sole 24 Ore, which has full ownership of the Italian employers' federation.

Departments 

The University of Foggia is divided into these six departments:

 Department of Law
 Department of Economics
 Department of Clinical and Experimental Medicine
 Department of Medical and [Surgical Sciences]
 Department of Sciences of Agriculture, Food and Environment
 Department of Humanities, Literature and Culture Heritage 
The University divides departments to aid students into the right department to, as close as possible, match their interests, as well as to avoid confusion. 
The Faculty of Agriculture is organized in 3 departments: 
The Department of Production, Engineering, Mechanical and Applied Economical Science for Agro-Zootechnical Systems 
The Department of Agricultural and Environmental Science, Chemistry and Plant Protection  
The Department of Food Science
The department of Agriculture has expanded from the original small department as enrolments have increased.

International programs 
The University itself has agreements with 20 foreign university to accommodate international students, as well as partakes in Socrates/Erasmus, Leonardo and TEMPUS media programs.

Academic calendar 
The first semester of the academic calendar for the University of Foggia runs from the third week of September to the second week of December while the second semester runs from the first week of March to the end of May. Classes usually run from Mondays to Fridays, Classes do not run during the month of August as well as on a Bank Holiday. Courses are based on semesters, and within those two semesters there are two holidays around the Christmas and Easter time interval.

Degree system 
The degree system is broken down into three sub categories, which are the First-level degrees, the Second-level degrees, and the master's degree, which in Italian is called a "magistrali".

The number of degrees within the main 3 are:
22 First-level Degree
10 Second-Level Degree
3 Master's degrees

Controversies
In November 2018, four academics were fired from the Agrarian Department after their charge of the irregularities in an internal public exam.

Rectors 
Antonio Muscio (1999-2008)
Giuliano Volpe (2008-2013)
Maurizio Ricci (2013 - )

See also 
 List of Italian universities
 Foggia
 BioGeM consortium

References

External links 
 University of Foggia Website (English)
 Guide for international students

Universities in Italy
Foggia
Educational institutions established in 1999
Buildings and structures in the Province of Foggia
Education in Apulia
1999 establishments in Italy